Blackburn Barrett Dovener (April 20, 1842 – May 9, 1914) was a Republican politician from West Virginia who served as a United States representative. Dovener was born in Tays Valley, Virginia, in Cabell County (now in West Virginia) on April 20, 1842. He served as a member of the  54th, 55th, 56th, 57th, 58th and 59th United States Congresses. He died in 1914.

Dovener taught school from 1858 to 1861. When he was nineteen, he  raised a company and served as captain of Company A, 15th West Virginia Volunteer Infantry Regiment. He became captain of an Ohio River steamboat in 1867. After studying law, he was admitted to the bar in 1873 and entered practice in Wheeling, West Virginia. He gained some fame there as counsel to murder defendant Taylor Strauder, taking the case (Strauder v. West Virginia) all the way to the Supreme Court of the United States, winning an important legal victory for the civil rights of freedmen.

He married Margaret Lynch, a native of Pittsburgh, Pennsylvania. When she was quite young her parents moved to Wheeling, Virginia, now West Virginia, and here she grew to beautiful young womanhood. Her father was a Union man in those days when it cost something in Virginia to be a Union man, as also was her husband. At the commencement of the Civil War, when only nineteen years old age, Dovener raised a company of loyal Virginians, and served in the Union Army during the entire war. It was when he came to Wheeling to be mustered in that he first met Miss Lynch, then a beautiful young girl of seventeen. They corresponded until the close of the war, when they were married. Their younger son, Robert, died in his twenty-second year. Their elder son, William, was a talented lawyer, like his father.

He served as member of the West Virginia House of Delegates in 1883 and 1884. His candidacy for election to the Fifty-second Congress was unsuccessful. In 1894, he won election as a Republican to the Fifty-fourth and to the five succeeding Congresses (March 4, 1895 - March 3, 1907). His candidacy for renomination was unsuccessful, and he returned to his legal practice in Wheeling. He retired to Glen Echo, Maryland, until his death on May 9, 1914. He was buried in Arlington National Cemetery.

See also

United States congressional delegations from West Virginia

References

 Retrieved on 2008-02-09

External links

1842 births
1914 deaths
19th-century American lawyers
20th-century American lawyers
Military personnel from West Virginia
Burials at Arlington National Cemetery
Republican Party members of the West Virginia House of Delegates
People from Cabell County, West Virginia
People from Glen Echo, Maryland
Politicians from Wheeling, West Virginia
People of West Virginia in the American Civil War
Union Army officers
West Virginia lawyers
Republican Party members of the United States House of Representatives from West Virginia
19th-century American politicians
Lawyers from Wheeling, West Virginia